Sun Shipbuilding & Drydock Company (1917–1989) was a major shipbuilding company in Chester, Pennsylvania on the Delaware River. 

Its primary product was tankers, but the company built many types of ships over its 70-year history. During World War II, it participated in the U.S. Government's Emergency Shipbuilding Program. The company was also part of the U.S. aerospace industry during the Cold War; it built various propulsion research & development structures, including the largest U.S. rocket test chamber, for Aerojet General in 1963.

History 
The company was developed by Sun Oil Company, and launched its first ship in 1917, just as the United States was entering World War I. Under the direction of its president, John Glenn Pew, the company experienced tremendous success over the following decades. In the 1920s, it had become a large shipyard that built tankers for the Standard Oil Company.  In 1936, the Pew family offered John J. McClure and his Republican political machine control over hiring at Sun Shipbuilding as patronage to lure him out of retirement after the scandal involving the Rum Ring Trial.

By the start of World War II, Sun was among the country's five largest shipyards, with eight slipways. Twenty slipways were added during the war, making Sun Ship the country's largest shipyard. At its peak, the company employed more than 40,000 workers at four shipyards.  During World War II, Sun Shipbuilding was the largest private-sector employer of African-Americans in the United States and controversially segregated many of the black workers to yard #4.

Sun Shipbuilding built 281 T2 tankers during World War II, about 40% of the U.S. wartime total. It also built hospital ships, cargo ships, and escort carriers for the United States Maritime Commission (USMC). On 27 September 1941, it contributed one of the 14 ships launched on Liberty Fleet Day: SS Surprise. Sun Shipbuilding originally had a contract to build 30 of the C4 ships. The USMC prioritized Sun's expertise in building urgently needed T2-SE-A1 tankers and withdrew 20 C4s from Sun and assigned them to Kaiser's Richmond, California yard. The Sun ships, designated C4-S-B2, became War Shipping Administration troopships operated by commercial agents or Navy hospital ships.

Sun continued as a merchant shipbuilder after the war, but sold the South and #4 Yards for industrial development.

In the 1970s, Sun built ten roll-on/roll-off (ro/ro) ships for various operators.  One of them, sailing under the name SS El Faro, was lost in a hurricane on October 1, 2015, while steaming from Jacksonville, Florida, to San Juan, Puerto Rico.

On or around February 18, 1971, the Glomar Explorer, a top secret ship was designed and built for the CIA to raise a sunken Soviet submarine lost 2 years earlier in the Pacific.

Pennsylvania Shipbuilding Company 
The company was sold to Pennsylvania Shipbuilding in 1982, and closed in 1989. The Central Yard site has been sold or leased for multiple uses, while the North Yard is now an independent cargo terminal.

Harrah's Philadelphia 
In 2006, a new casino then named "Harrah's Chester" opened on the Sun Ship site and after a rename in May 2012 is currently in operation as "Harrah's Philadelphia".

See also
Category: Ships built by the Sun Shipbuilding & Drydock Company

References

External links
Sun Shipbuilding historical site
Federation of American Scientists Military Analysis Network
 http://users.telenet.be/doxford-matters/sundoxford.html
http://shipbuildinghistory.com/shipyards/large/sun.htm

1917 establishments in Pennsylvania
1989 disestablishments in Pennsylvania
American companies established in 1917
Chester, Pennsylvania
Companies based in Delaware County, Pennsylvania
Companies disestablished in 1989
Defunct manufacturing companies based in Pennsylvania
Defunct shipbuilding companies of the United States
Sunoco LP